Football in Somalia is run by the Somali Football Federation. The association administers the national football team, as well as the Premier League. Football is the most popular sport in Somalia.

History
 
Football was introduced in Somalia by the Italians, as an amateur sport activity of colonial Mogadishu & surroundings in the late 1920s. In the 1930s, Italian authorities began to organize professional sport in Somalia. These sports were initially concentrated only in the capital Mogadishu.
 

 

In 1931 governor Maurizio Rava created the Federazione Sportiva della Somalia, which organized competences of football for the Italian community and promoted the first sport activities among the young native population. In 1933 the first Somali football championship was created in Mogadishu, called Coppa Federazione Sportiva, with three teams ("Societa' Mogadiscio", "Milizia" and the winner "Marina"). In 1938 the football championship was won by the "Amaruini" team, made up mainly of local Somalis; in 1939 the winning team was the "Araba".
 
The full Somali Football teams were established initially around the second half of the 1940s: their competitions were not well organised, but these activities are credited for the initiating of the "Somali liberation movement". The Somali Youth League was indeed an organization created by thirteen young men and Football was then one of their common interests. SYL had established a strong team from the locals to play the Italian teams after WWII: this team had to change its name to "Bondhere" (later won the first competitions held under the full Somali management in 1958 when the first Somali commissioner for sport was established).
 
In 1955 -during the Trust Territory of Somalia under Italian administration- was created the first football stadium in Mogadishu: the Coni Stadium, later called Banadir Stadium. The teams that played a Trust Territory of Somalia championship with the stadium inauguration were: "Lavori Publici", "Autoparco", "El Gab", "Sicurezza", "Somali Police FC" and "AS Mogadiscio" (the former AC Mogadiscio, that won the championship in 1947).

The first Somali National Football team travelled to Mombasa , Kenya around 1957/8 and lost by five goals to nil (5-0).  

In 1967 started the official "Somali championship" and the first was won by  the Somali Police FC of Mogadishu (called "Booliska" in Somali language). The next championships were won by Hoga of Mogadishu (or Xoogga) in 1968, by Lavori Pubblici FC of Mogadishu (or "Jeenyo/LLPP") in 1969-1970-1971 and by Horseed FC of Horseed near Merca in 1972.
 
The Somali Football Federation (SFF) was founded in 1951. In 1962, the SFF became a FIFA member. It later joined the Confederation of African Football (CAF) in 1968 and the Union of Arab Football Associations (UAFA) in 1974. The SFF is responsible for organizing matches between local teams and enforcing rules and regulations of the game during matches. The Federation is also in charge of the National Football Team, League and Cup.

In 2010, the Mire Aware Stadium in Garowe hosted the Somali National Football Tournament, the first nationwide football competition held since 1987. Organized by the autonomous Puntland administration in conjunction with the Somali Football Federation, the tournament also marked the first time that the event was held outside Mogadishu.

League system

Football stadiums in Somalia

References